Work It is a 2020 American dance comedy film directed by Laura Terruso and written by Alison Peck. Produced by Alicia Keys, Leslie Morgenstein and Elysa Koplovitz Dutton, the film stars Sabrina Carpenter, Liza Koshy, Keiynan Lonsdale, Michelle Buteau and Jordan Fisher as high school students of different backgrounds, and follows their journey to win the titular Work It dance competition. The film was released on Netflix on August 7, 2020.

Plot

Quinn Ackerman, a quirky and intelligent high school senior, works as a technical director for the Thunderbirds, her high school's elite dance team, which is well known around the state as the reigning champions of the Work It dance competition. When Quinn spills coffee on the control panel and ruins a live performance, the ruthless leader of the Thunderbirds, Julliard Pembroke, fires her from the position.

Quinn's dream to attend Duke University, her late father's alma mater, is soured when the admissions counselor, Veronica Ramirez, informs that her chances of standing out to the admission's team are not good. Quinn misleads Ramirez into thinking that she is a dancer on the Thunderbirds, even though she only worked the lighting. Ramirez is instantly impressed, and vows to see her perform live at the Work It dance competition. Though she considers confessing to her white lie, Quinn instead decides to commit to it, realizing it's her only chance of getting into Duke. Quinn enlists the help of her best friend, Jasmine Hale, who is a dancer for the Thunderbirds herself, to teach her how to dance and prepare her for the team's open auditions in two weeks. Quinn's dancing skills improve substantially by the time of the audition, but Julliard still rejects her. After Jasmine stands up to him and defends Quinn, Julliard sarcastically suggests that the two start their own dance team, which Quinn does. Jasmine reluctantly agrees to quit the Thunderbirds in favor of Quinn's new team.

Quinn and Jasmine research a former champion of the Work It competition, Jake Taylor, who stopped competing and vanished after a knee injury two years prior. Quinn tracks him down and approaches him at the dance studio where he now works, and asks him to be a choreographer for her team, but Jake rejects her, insisting that dance is done with passion, and can't be learned by thinking. Meanwhile, the girls round up a group of unknown dancers at their school who all differ in style, including Raven, a goth and rocker; Chris, a soccer player; DJ Tapes, a kid who sells mixtapes; Robby, a karate student; and Priya, an Indian style dancer. After seeing the team's potential during an informal dance meetup, Jake agrees to choreograph for Quinn's team at Work It, but only if they can win the upcoming qualifying competition by themselves. Under the name "TBD", they cut qualifiers but on a technicality issue with an opposing team. 

Jake and Quinn spend more time together, and one night, Jake takes her aside and decides to experiment with freestyle dancing with her. As the two practice, Quinn's talent surfaces, and they kiss. With newfound confidence, Quinn takes it easier on herself and puts more effort into her dancing and teamwork.

Quinn emails Veronica Ramirez and informs her that she has started her own team and that they will be competing at Work It. However, when Julliard discovers that Jake is choreographing for the Quinn's team, he turns them in for using the studio to practice without paying, and Jake loses his job. Quinn's grades drop due to her dedication to the team, and she receives an email from the Duke admissions team informing her that Veronica no longer works there. Quinn confesses everything to her mom, and they agree that she should quit the dance team and bring her grades up before turning in her final transcript. The team feels betrayed by Quinn's departure, especially Jasmine, who rejoins the Thunderbirds, and Quinn ends her romance with Jake after deciding she doesn't have the time for it. She later rediscovers her own passion for dance and reconciles with Jake, and they both decide to bring the team back together. Quinn reconciles with Jasmine, who quits the Thunderbirds and rejoins the TBDs.

The group begins to learn each other's unique dance styles, and Jake incorporates them into the choreography. On the day of the competition, Quinn's mother discovers that she is still in dance and tries to stop her from leaving, but Quinn steals the car keys and leaves. When Quinn arrives, the TBDs are already on stage, and she enters halfway through the act. The TBDs narrowly win the competition over the Thunderbirds, and both Jasmine and Julliard are approached by a scout from the New York Dance Academy. Quinn runs into Veronica, who is now working at NYU, and she invites her to apply for the fall semester.

Cast
 Sabrina Carpenter as Quinn Ackerman
 Liza Koshy as Jasmine Hale
 Keiynan Lonsdale as Julliard Pembroke

 Michelle Buteau as Veronica Ramirez

 Jordan Fisher as Jake Taylor
 Drew Ray Tanner as Charlie

 Jayne Eastwood as Ruthie (Nursing Home)
 Naomi Snieckus as Maria Ackerman
 Briana Andrade-Gomes as Trinity
 Kalliane Bremault as Brit Turner
 Bianca Asilo as Raven
 Neil Robles as Chris Royo
 Nathaniel Scarlette as DJ Tapes
 Tyler Hutchings as Robby G.
 Indiana Mehta as Priya Singh
 Wolfgang Novogratz as Worker (bed shop)

Production
On April 2, 2019, Adam Fogelson of STX announced the film along with Alicia Keys producing it. On May 2, 2019, it was announced that Sabrina Carpenter, Liza Koshy and Keiynan Lonsdale would star in the film. Laura Terruso was announced as the director, and that Terruso would rewrite the film from an original script from Alison Peck, with Elysa Koplovitz Dutton Leslie Morgenstein from Alloy Entertainment producing the film alongside Keys. On July 2, 2019, Drew Ray Tanner, Michelle Buteau and Jordan Fisher all joined the cast and it was announced that Netflix would distribute the film. It was also announced that day that Carpenter would also serve as an executive producer.

Filming took place from June 2019 to August 2019 at the University of Toronto (St. George Campus), Humber college Lakeshore Campus, Toronto, York University Keele campus in Toronto, Canada and on the campus of California State University, Northridge in Los Angeles in December 2019.

Soundtrack

Track listing

 "Let Me Move You" - Sabrina Carpenter
 "Wow" - Zara Larsson
 "Thinkin Bout You" - Ciara
 "I Am the Best" - 2NE1
 "Do It Like This" - Daphne Willis
 "Onset" - Haiku Hands featuring Mad Zach
 "Motivation" - Normani
 "Feeling It" - Danger Twins
 "Break My Heart" - Dua Lipa
 "Cool" - Dua Lipa
 "Get On Your Feet" - Gloria Estefan
 "Mess" - Jordan Fisher
 "Treat Myself" - Meghan Trainor

Release
Work It was released by Netflix on August 7, 2020. It was the top-watched film in its debut weekend, before falling to fifth place in its second weekend.

Reception 
On Metacritic, the film has a weighted average score of 58 out of 100, based on nine critics, indicating "mixed or average reviews".

References

External links
 
 

2020 films
2020 comedy films
Alloy Entertainment films
American coming-of-age comedy films
American dance films
Films about interracial romance
Films scored by Germaine Franco
Films shot in Toronto
English-language Netflix original films
Jukebox musical films
2020s English-language films
2020s American films